Drogo was the count of Vannes and Nantes and duke of Brittany from 952, when he succeeded his father,  Alan Wrybeard, until his death in 958. 

Drogo was a minor throughout his reign, and so he was under a Regency. Drogo's Regents were his uncle the Count of Blois, Theobald I (who entrusted the administration of the Duchy to Wicohen, Archbishop of Dol, and the Count of Rennes, Juhel Berengar) and his stepfather the Count of Anjou, Fulk II, who married the Wrybeard's widow.

The Chronique de Nantes suggests that Drogo was murdered on the orders of Fulk II, Count of Anjou.

References

Sources

See also
Dukes of Brittany family tree

958 deaths
10th-century dukes of Brittany
Dukes of Brittany
Monarchs who died as children
Medieval child monarchs
Year of birth unknown
French murder victims